Dundee Township occupies the  square in the Northeast corner of Kane County, Illinois.  It includes West and East Dundee, Carpentersville, Sleepy Hollow, Gilberts and portions of Elgin, Barrington Hills, Hoffman Estates, and Algonquin.  It is divided by the Fox River.

As of the 2010 census, its population was 64,167 and it contained 21,635 housing units.

History
Dundee Township is named after Dundee, New York, which in turn is named after the city in Scotland.

Historically, industry and residential areas straddled the river, with most of the land on the western half of the township devoted to agriculture.  Today, the township has become predominantly a suburb of Chicago.

The township's history is documented by the Dundee Township Historical Society, and parts of Carpentersville and East and West Dundee are recognized as the Dundee Township Historic District. The Milk Pail Restaurant east of East Dundee is also considered a historic site.

Geography
It is located at 42.111813 N, 88.286978 W.

Demographics

Government
The township is governed by a four-person elected Board of Trustees.  The Township also has an elected Assessor, Clerk, Highway Commissioner and Supervisor.  The Township Office is located at 611 E. Main Street, Suite 201
East Dundee, IL.

In addition to the township government, two other entities serve an area that approximates the Township.  The Dundee Township Park District administers  of parks, two golf courses and two swimming pools.  The Dundee Township Library District operates a library in East Dundee.

References

External links
 Official Website
 Library District Website
 Park District Website

Townships in Kane County, Illinois
Algonquin, Illinois
Townships in Illinois